The Pilatus B4-PC11 (also known as the PC-11 in the Pilatus numbering sequence) is an all-metal intermediate glider built by Pilatus Aircraft of Switzerland.

The B4-PC11 is designed to Standard Class specifications, meaning that it has a 15-metre wingspan and no flaps. Air brakes are provided on the top surface of each wing for glidepath control. Construction is aluminium, with foam ribs in the mainplane, fin and tailplane.

Development
The design of this glider originated in the 1960s, when the company Firma Rheintalwerke G. Basten (from which the "B" in the original designation is derived) manufactured the first two prototypes. The designers were Ingo Herbst, Manfred Küppers and Rudolf Reinke. The first flight of the first prototype took place on 7 November 1966. However, no series production was started.

In 1972 Pilatus bought the manufacturing licence for the B-4 and renamed it the B4-PC11. In the spring of the same year the first production example (numbered HB-1100) made its first flight.

A total of 322 B4-PC11s of all versions were built by Pilatus by 1980, when the license to manufacture the craft was sold to Nippi Aircraft of Japan, who built only 13 examples, plus a two-seater designated the Nippi B4T.

Subsequently, in 1994, EWMS Technomanagement bought the rights to produce and service the B4-PC11. This company also specializes in renovating and upgrading older B4-PC11 craft. In addition, it manufactures a motorized B4-PC11.

Variants
B4-PC11 permitted to fly a number of aerobatic manoeuvres, it was not permitted to do inverted loops or flick/snap/quick maneuvers. The B4-PC11 was available with either fixed or retractable landing gear.
B4-PC11A developed to perform inverted loops and was also able to handle higher g-forces. 
B4-PC11AF released in 1975, with full aerobatic capabilities.
Lynch B4M1 a motor glider conversion in Australia by John F. Lynch, powered by a  König SC 430 engine.

The changes in construction from B4-PC11 through A and AF variants were to add extra ribs through the fuselage section (increasing torsional rigidity, only AF variant), and to modify the control column stops and shorten the rudder, giving greater control surface deflection.

Specifications

See also

References

 Hardy, M. Gliders & Sailplanes of the World. Ian Allan, 1982

PC-11
1960s Swiss sailplanes
Glider aircraft
High-wing aircraft
T-tail aircraft
Aircraft first flown in 1966